The Fijian ambassador in Beijing is the official representative of the government in Suva to the Government of the People's Republic of China.

History 
 In 1975, the Republic of the Fiji Islands was the first government of the Pacific to establish diplomatic relations with the Government of the People's Republic of China.
 In 1976 the government of Beijing established an embassy in Suva Fiji.
 From 1982, the Fijian ambassador to Tokyo (Japan) was concurrently accredited in China.
 In 2001, Fiji opened its embassy in Beijing.

List of representatives 

China–Fiji relations

References 

 
China
Fiji